Taishevo (Tayış) is a rural locality (a village) in Yunusovsky Selsoviet, Mechetlinsky District, Bashkortostan, Russia. The population was 343 as of 2010. There are 5 streets.

Geography 
Taishevo is located 33 km southeast of Bolsheustyikinskoye (the district's administrative centre) by road. Azangulovo is the nearest rural locality.

References 

Rural localities in Mechetlinsky District